Hirschfeld may refer to:

People
 Leopold Hirschfeld (1798–1893), Hungarian businessman, brewer
 Abraham Hirschfeld (1919–2005), Polish-born New York real estate developer
 Al Hirschfeld (1903–2003), American caricaturist
Al Hirschfeld Theatre, in Manhattan
 Alexa Hirschfeld, American entrepreneur
 Emil Hirschfeld (1903–1968), German athlete
 Gerhard Hirschfeld (born 1946), German historian
 James Hirschfeld (chief executive), American entrepreneur
 James William Peter Hirschfeld (born 1940), British mathematician
 Jimmy Hirschfeld (born 1929), American television director and producer 
 Lars Hirschfeld (born 1978), Canadian football goalkeeper
 Ludwik Hirszfeld (Ludwig Hirschfeld, 1884–1954), Polish physician and immunologist
 Magnus Hirschfeld (1868–1935), German physician, sexologist, and gay rights advocate
Magnus Hirschfeld Medal, for outstanding service to sexual science
 Moritz von Hirschfeld (1791–1859), Prussian general
 Otto Hirschfeld (1843–1922), German epigraphist and professor of ancient history
 Otto Hirschfeld (physician) (1898–1957), Australian medical practitioner, academic and university chancellor 
 Robert Hirschfeld (1942–2009), American actor and author
 Wilson Hirschfeld (1916–1974), American journalist
Emil Kio (1894–1965), Russian magician, born Emil Hirschfeld-Renard
Rachel Hirschfeld (attorney), an attorney in the area of pet trust law
Yizhar Hirschfeld (1950–2006), Israeli archaeologist

Places in Germany
Hirschfeld, Brandenburg, in the Elbe-Elster district, Brandenburg
Hirschfeld, Rhineland-Palatinate, in the Rhein-Hunsrück district, Rhineland-Palatinate
Hirschfeld, Saxony, in the Zwickauer Land district, Saxony
Hirschfeld, Thuringia, in the district of Greiz, Thuringia

Other uses
Hirschfeld Eddy Foundation for the Human Rights of Lesbians, Gays, Bisexuals and Transgender People

See also
 Hirschfield, a surname

German toponymic surnames